Ringa Ropo-Junnila (born 16 February 1966) is a Finnish athlete. She competed in the women's long jump at the 1992 Summer Olympics.

She's the mother of high jumper Ella Junnila.

References

1966 births
Living people
Athletes (track and field) at the 1992 Summer Olympics
Finnish female long jumpers
Olympic athletes of Finland
Place of birth missing (living people)